Jean-Baptiste Guesnay (1585 - November 4, 1658) was a French Jesuit and author.

Biography
He was born in Aix-en-Provence. He died in Avignon.

He opposed the views expressed by Jean de Launoy, who had dismissed the Provençal legends of Mary Magdalene as pious nonsense.

Works
 Magdalena Massiliensis advena, seu de adventu Magdalenae in Gallias, & Massiliam appulsu. Disquisitio theologica historica (1643)
 Le triomphe de la Madeleine en la créance et vénération de ses reliques en Provence (1647). Published under the pseudonym of Denis de la Sainte-Baume
 Provinciae Massiliensis ac reliquae Phocensis Annales, sive Massilia gentilis et christiana; read online

References

Further reading
 Michel Feuillas - La Controverse magdalénienne au milieu du XVIIè siècle. Ripostes provençales à Jean de Launoy 
Étienne-Michel Faillon, Monuments inédits sur l'apostolat de sainte Marie-Madeleine en Provence et sur les autres apôtres de cette contrée : saint Lazare, saint Maximin, sainte Marthe et les saintes Maries Jacobé et Salomé, J.-P. Migne, 1848
 Bibliotheque des Ecrivains de la Compagnie de Jesus, ou Notices Biblographiques. pp.279-282

External links 
 Jean Baptiste Guesnay at the Bibliothèque nationale de France

17th-century French Jesuits
French male non-fiction writers
People from Aix-en-Provence
1585 births
1658 deaths